Wang Zhongyu (1891 – 1981) was a Chinese politician. An early activist of the Kuomintang, he was a follower Sun Yat-sen and Ding Weifen and a close friend of the Kuomintang veteran Gu Zhenggang.

Biography 
Born Jin Chuo, Wang was originally from Liuguzhuang, Donggang District, Rizhao City, Shandong Province. He attended Beijing China University, Moscow Sun Yat-sen University and Waseda University in Japan. Returning to China, he became a member of the Kuomintang committee in Shandong. He served as Minister of Works for Peking municipality and director of the Transport Burueau in Tianjin.

Having been a delegate to the Constituent National Assembly that drew up the Constitution of the Republic of China, he was elected to the Legislative Yuan in the 1948 elections from Shandong Province. He relocated to Taiwan during the Chinese Civil War, where he remained a member of parliament until his death in 1981.

References

1891 births
Moscow Sun Yat-sen University alumni
Waseda University alumni
Members of the Kuomintang
Members of the 1st Legislative Yuan
Members of the 1st Legislative Yuan in Taiwan
1981 deaths